is a passenger railway station located in the city of Akiruno, Tokyo, Japan, operated by East Japan Railway Company (JR East).

Lines 
Akigawa Station is served by the Itsukaichi Line, and is located 5.7 kilometers from the starting point of the line at Haijima Station.

Station layout 
This station consists of two side platforms serving two ground-level tracks, with an elevated station building located above the tracks and platforms. The station is staffed.

Platforms

History
It was renamed Akigawa Station on 31 March 1987. With the privatization of Japanese National Railways (JNR) on 1 April 1987, the station came under the control of JR East.

Passenger statistics
In fiscal 2019, the station was used by an average of 6,499 passengers daily (boarding passengers only).

The passenger figures for previous years are as shown below.

Surrounding area
 Aki River

See also
 List of railway stations in Japan

References

External links 

JR East - Akigawa Station 

Railway stations in Japan opened in 1925
Railway stations in Tokyo
Akiruno, Tokyo
Itsukaichi Line